A person who lives in or comes from Muskogee, Oklahoma, USA is called an Okie from Muskogee (although many consider the term disparaging). This is a list of well-known people who were born or lived in the city of Muskogee.

A
Reubin O'Donovan Askew

B
ZerNona Black
Dan Boren
Don Byas

C
Xernona Clayton
Tom Coburn
Gene Conley
Eddie Crowder

E
Drew Edmondson
Ed Edmondson
J. Howard Edmondson
James E. Edmondson
Joseph L. Epps

F
George Faught

G
Sandy Garrett

H
John Tyler Hammons
E. Summers Hardy
Charles N. Haskell
Joan Hill

J
Dennis Jernigan
James R. Jones
Cato June

K
L. R. Kershaw
Barney Kessel
Leo Kottke

M
Stacy McGee
Harold MacDowell
Roberta McCain
Bill Mercer
William W. Momyer

O
Jack Oakie

R
Joe A. Rector
Robert Reed
John N. Reese, Jr.
Thomas Ryan

S
Jerry L. Smith
Berton E. Spivy, Jr.

T
Robert Thomas
Jerome Tiger
Martin E. Trapp

U
 Carrie Underwood

V
Sarah Vowell

W
Pat Waak
Les Walrond
Robyn Watkins
Larry Winget, bestselling author, television personality and social commentator

See also
Muskogee, Oklahoma

 
Muskogee, Oklahoma
Muskogee